Lycée français de Bakou (LFB) is a French international school in Baku, Azerbaijan founded in 2013 in order to provide education for French speaking foreigners and Azerbaijanis who wish to study French. It serves école maternelle and école primaire directly, while collège (junior high school) and lycée (senior high school/sixth form) are served with National Centre for Distance Education (CNED). It is affiliated with the Mission Laïque Française (MLF).

History 
Heydar Aliyev Foundation, Embassy of France in Baku and the State Oil Company of the Azerbaijan Republic (SOCAR) initialized the building of the school by the agreement signed in March 2011. Foundation ceremony held in the same year by the participation of the presidents of two countries.

During the official trip to Azerbaijan in 2014, president of France François Hollande met the construction procedures of Lycée français de Bakou by the attendance of Azerbaijani president İlham Aliyev and the first lady Mehriban Aliyeva. The opening ceremony held on September 12, 2014, and followed by the participation of Ilham Aliyev and Mehriban Aliyeva.

Overview 
The Lycée français de Bakou is situated in the area called "White City" in Baku. The school is capable to provide educational service for 400 students. Approximately, 70% of the students are Azerbaijanis. The rest of students are from various countries. Trainings are taught in French and qualified to the France National Education System. There are organized several special trainings such as, additional pedagogical trainings, French as a foreign language and theater for non-French students. Azerbaijani language is taught as a mother tongue. Besides, English is also taught as an additional language and Cambridge University program is applied for non-Azerbaijanis.

Graduation Certificates are accepted by the Ministry of Education (Azerbaijan) and Ministry of National Education (France). Moreover, graduates optionally can apply to all universities in France.

The structure of school 
Pedagogical activities at school are realized by the head of school. The head of school is defined by the Management Committee and makes reports to the committee.

The Management Committee constituted of four delegates such as, consultant of French Embassy in Azerbaijan, representatives from the Ministry of Education of Azerbaijan, State Oil Company of the Azerbaijan Republic and Heydar Aliyev Foundation.

Admission 
At the age of 2 children are accepted to the nursery school. Two types of schedule are available for pupils; 1) 8:00 a.m. – 15:00 p.m., 2) 8:00 a.m. – 19:00 p.m.

When children are 6 years old they can apply for primary school. Application procedure from the third grade follows by French exam. Lessons last seven hours including breaks from 8:00 a.m. until 15:00 p.m. After the lessons additional trainings are arranged for students.

Students are accepted to college and lyceum from the fourth and sixth grade. Distance education CNED is available from the eighth grade. The lessons start at 8:00 a.m. and continue until 15:00 p.m. During the week Azerbaijani language, Literature, Geography and History compulsory lessons are organized between 15:00 p.m. and 15:45 p.m.

See also

 Baku International School - English-language international school

Notes

Baku
Baku
International schools in Azerbaijan
Schools in Baku
Azerbaijan–France relations
Educational institutions established in 2013
2013 establishments in Azerbaijan